The American cheetah is either of two feline species of the extinct genus Miracinonyx, endemic to North America during the Pleistocene epoch (2.6 million to 12,000 years ago) and morphologically similar to the modern cheetah (Acinonyx jubatus). These cats were originally known from fragments of skeletons, but nearly complete skeletons have been recovered from Natural Trap Cave in northern Wyoming.

The two species commonly identified are M. inexpectatus and M. trumani. Sometimes, a third species, M. studeri, is included, but it is more often listed as a junior synonym of M. inexpectatus. Both species are similar to the modern cheetah, with faces shortened and nasal cavities expanded for increased oxygen capacity, and legs proportioned for swift running. However, these similarities may not be inherited from a common ancestor, but may instead result from either parallel or convergent evolution. These were larger than a modern cheetah and similar in size to a modern northern cougar. Being a cursorial predator, it most likely preyed on creatures like pronghorns.

Discovery and naming
Fossils attributed to American cheetahs were first described from several isolated teeth from Port Kennedy Bone Cave from Pennsylvania, dating back to the Irvingtonian age. The American paleontologist Edward Drinker Cope considered these to be related to the spotted hyena, and described the material as Crocuta inexpectata in 1895. In 1899 he reclassified the specimens as related to the snow leopard, Unicia inexpectata. More fossil material were recovered from similar age deposits in Maryland and Arkansas, where in 1941 American paleontologist George Gaylord Simpson found them all belonging to the same animal, one he considered to be more closely related to the cougar (naming the animal as Felis (Puma) inexpectata. A second species, Felis studeri, was described by D. E. Savage in 1960 based on a more complete material consisting of extensive postcranial and cranial material of the animal. However, a 1976 review of fossil pumas from Kurtén considered F. inexpectata and F. studeri to be the same species, with F. inexpectata having priority. The other valid species (then as Felis trumani) was described in 1969 by Orr based on a complete skull from the Late Pleistocene found in Crypt Cave, Nevada.

In 1979 Adams found these animals to be intermediates between cheetahs and cougars and decided to placed them in their own genus Miracinonyx. The name is a combination of the Latin "mir" (wonderful) and Acinonyx, which is a combination of the Greek for ἁκινητος (akinitos) meaning 'unmoved' or 'motionless', and ὄνυξ (onyx) meaning 'nail' or 'hoof'.

Fossil distribution
Fossil remains of Miracinonyx have been found across the United States and as far south as Mexico. Fossils of M. trumani have been found in Arizona, New Mexico, Florida, Wyoming, Colorado, Nebraska, South Carolina, Maryland and Pennsylvania. The most complete finds of M. trumani are from the Natural Trap Cave in northern Wyoming. Fossil remains of M. inexpectatus found in Hamilton Cave in West Virginia show that this creature lived with and competed with other large cats like jaguars and saber-toothed cats. Fossils of M. inexpectatus have also been found in Florida, Texas, Colorado, Georgia, South Carolina, Pennsylvania, Maryland, and California. In 2022, the skeletal remains of a M. inexpectatus were retrieved from a cave in southwestern Virginia.

Taxonomy and evolution

Research into the American cheetah has been contradictory. It was originally believed to be an early cougar representative, before being reclassified in the 1970s as a close relative of the cheetah. This suggested that the ancestors of the cheetah diverged from the Puma lineage in the Americas and migrated back to the Old World, a claim repeated as recently as 2006 by Johnson et al., and in 2015 by Dobrynin et al. However, other research by Barnett and Faurby, through examining mitochondrial DNA and reanalyzing morphology, has suggested reversing the reclassification: the American cheetah developed cheetah-like characteristics through parallel evolution, but it is most closely related to Puma and not to the modern cheetah of Africa and Asia. Moreover, Faurby notes that  no Acinonyx fossils have been found in North America, and no Miracinonyx fossils elsewhere. However, O'Brien et al. (2016) posit that the supposed homoplasy between the genera is controversial, as it is asserted that is not necessarily any conclusive anatomical or genetic basis for dismissing a homologous relationship between Acinonyx and Miracinonyx. The veracity of the origin of the modern cheetah is also debated; however, Miracinonyx is believed to have evolved from cougar-like ancestors, regardless of whether in the Old World or the New World.

The cougar and M. trumani are believed to have split from a cougar-like ancestor around three million years ago; where M. inexpectatus fits in is unclear, although it is probably a more primitive version of M. trumani.

Below is the phylogeny from Chimento and Dondas (2017) when describing the earliest known fossil record of cougars in South America. As shown here, they found Miracinonyx to be a sister taxon to Puma (though in their paper they considered the former genus to be an extinct subgenus of the latter).

Behavior 
Fossils from Arizona show that American cheetahs were territorial animals, with evidence of pathologies being found on some of the bones.

References

Piacenzian first appearances
Pleistocene carnivorans
Pleistocene extinctions
Pliocene carnivorans
Prehistoric felines
Prehistoric mammals of North America
Fossil taxa described in 1979